Antagomirs, also known as anti-miRs, are a class of chemically engineered oligonucleotides designed to silence endogenous microRNAs (also known as miRNAs or miRs).

Antagomirs are a kind of antisense oligonucleotide, as their sequence is complementary to their specific miRNA target. Their structure has modifications so as to make them more resistant to degradation. These include 2'-methoxy groups on the ribose sugar, backbones with phosphorothioate bonds, and cholesterol conjugation on the 3' end.

Mechanism of action 

Antagomirs are microRNA inhibitors that bind miRNAs and prevent them from binding to a target mRNA molecule, and the consequent degradation of that mRNA via the RNA-induced silencing complex (RISC). Due to the promiscuity of microRNAs, each of which regulate multiple mRNAs, antagomirs can potentially affect the expression of many different mRNA molecules besides the desired target.

Blockmirs are similarly engineered molecules which, on the other hand, are designed to have a sequence that is complementary to an mRNA sequence that is targeted by a microRNA. Upon binding to an untranslated region of an mRNA, blockmirs sterically block microRNAs from binding to the same site. Because blockmirs bind individual mRNAs and not miRNAs, their activity is more predictable than antagomirs' and less likely to cause off-target effects.

Applications 

Antagomirs are used as a method to constitutively inhibit the activity of specific miRNAs associated with disease. For example, antagomirs against miR-21 have been successfully used to inhibit fibrosis of heart and lung.

HCV 

The primary method for using microRNA technology to target the Hepatitis C Virus (HCV) is by knocking-out the liver-specific microRNA. miRNA-122 binds to the 5' untranslated region of HCV's mRNA strand and, contrary to miRNA's normal function of repressing mRNA, actually upregulates the expression of the Hepatitis C Virus. Thus, the therapeutic goal in such a case would be to keep miRNA-122 from binding to HCV mRNA in order to prevent this mRNA from being expressed. However, miRNA-122 also regulates cholesterol (HDL) and the activity of tumor-suppressor genes (oncogenes).This means that not only will knocking out the microRNA-122 reduce the HCV infection, but it will also reduce the activity of tumor suppressor genes, potentially leading to liver cancer. In order to target HCV mRNA specifically (instead of miRNA-122 as a whole), Blockmir technology has been developed to solely target HCV mRNA, thus avoiding any sort of tampering with oncogene expression. This may be achieved by designing a Blockmir that matches seed 1.

High-density lipoprotein 

MicroRNA-33a/b inhibition in mice leads to increased blood high-density lipoprotein (HDL) levels. Abca1 is essential for production of HDL precursors in liver cells. In macrophages, Abca1 excretes cholesterol from oxidized cholesterol-carrying lipoproteins and thus counteracts atherosclerotic plaques. From this, it is hypothesized that microRNA-33 affects HDL via regulation of Abca1. Therefore, in order to target the regulation of Abca1, a blockmir can be developed that specifically binds to Abca1 mRNA molecules, thus blocking its miRNA site and upregulating its expression. Such an application of blockmir technology could lead to overall increased HDL levels.

Insulin signalling 

MicroRNA-103/107 inhibition in mice leads to increased insulin sensitivity and signalling It has been previously shown that caveolin-1-deficient mice show insulin resistance. MicroRNA-103/107 inhibition in caveolin-1-deficient mice had no effect on insulin sensitivity and signalling. Thus, microRNA-103/107 may affect insulin sensitivity by targeting caveolin-1.

Ischemia and immunotherapy 

The blockmir CD5-2 has been shown to inhibit the interaction between miR-27 and VE-cadherin, enhancing recovery from ischemic injury in mice. The drug has also been shown to enhance T cell infiltration in combination with immunotherapy in mouse models of pancreatic cancer.

References

Nucleotides
Experimental drugs